The year 2003 is the third year in the history of Deep, a mixed martial arts promotion based in Japan. In 2003 Deep held 8 events beginning with, Deep: 8th Impact.

Title fights

Events list

Deep: clubDeep Osaka

Deep: clubDeep Osaka was an event held on December 7, 2003, at the Delfin Arena in Osaka, Japan.

Results

Deep: clubDeep West Chofu

Deep: clubDeep West Chofu was an event held on November 24, 2003, at the West Chofu Combat Sports Arena in Tokyo, Japan.

Results

Deep: 12th Impact

Deep: 12th Impact was an event held on September 15, 2003, at the Ota Ward Gymnasium in Tokyo, Japan.

Results

Deep: 11th Impact

Deep: 11th Impact was an event held on July 13, 2003, at the Grand Cube in Osaka, Japan.

Results

Deep: 10th Impact

Deep: 10th Impact was an event held on June 25, 2003, at Korakuen Hall in Tokyo, Japan.

Results

Deep: clubDeep: Challenge in Club Ozon

Deep: clubDeep: Challenge in Club Ozon was an event held on May 25, 2003, at Club Ozon in Nagoya, Japan.

Results

Deep: 9th Impact

Deep: 9th Impact was an event held on May 5, 2003, at Korakuen Hall in Tokyo, Japan.

Results

Deep: 8th Impact

Deep: 8th Impact was an event held on March 4, 2003, at Korakuen Hall in Tokyo, Japan.

Results

See also 
 Deep
 List of Deep champions
 List of Deep events

References

Deep (mixed martial arts) events
2003 in mixed martial arts